Neuronal Calcium Sensor is a large family of proteins which work as calcium dependent molecular switches and includes members like Frequenin (NCS1), recoverin, GCAP, neurocalcin, visinin etc. All the members carry 4 EF hand motifs (out of which only 2 or 3 bind calcium) and an N-myristoyl group.

Members of NCS family
 Highly evolutionarily conserved 
 NCS1 (Frequenin)
 VILIP-1 (Visinin-like-protein-1)
 HPCAL4 (Visinin-like-protein-2)
 HPCAL1 (Visinin-like-protein-3)
 hippocalcin
 neurocalcin
 recoverin
 Guanylate cyclase activator proteins (GCAPs)
 Potassium Channel interacting proteins (KChIPs 1–4), including:
KCNIP1,
KCNIP2,
Calsenilin or DREAM/KChIP-3/KCNIP3 (downstream regulatory element antagonist modulator/potassium channel interacting protein),
KCNIP4

References

External links
 
NCS proteins

Protein families